Kacharanlu (also Romanized as Kacharānlū; also known as Kachlānlū) is a village in Aladagh Rural District, in the Central District of Bojnord County, North Khorasan Province, Iran.  census, its population was 755, in 190 families.

References 

Populated places in Bojnord County